West Lothian is one of the 32 council areas of Scotland, and was one of its historic counties. The county was called Linlithgowshire until 1925. The historic county was bounded geographically by the Avon to the west and the Almond to the east. The modern council area occupies a larger area than the historic county. It was reshaped following local government reforms in 1975: some areas in the west were transferred to Falkirk; some areas in the east were transferred to Edinburgh; and some areas that had formerly been part of in Midlothian were added to West Lothian.

West Lothian lies on the southern shore of the Firth of Forth and is predominantly rural, though there were extensive coal, iron, and shale oil mining operations in the 19th and 20th centuries. These created distinctive red-spoil heaps (locally known as "bings") throughout the council area. The old county town was the royal burgh of Linlithgow, but the largest town (and the second largest town in the Lothian region after Edinburgh) is now Livingston. Other large towns in the county include Bathgate (a town with medieval origins that developed extensively during the industrial revolution) and the historic mining settlements of Armadale, Fauldhouse, Whitburn, West Calder, Uphall, and Broxburn.

Geography
The modern council area borders, in a clockwise direction, the council areas of Edinburgh, the Scottish Borders, North and South Lanarkshire, and Falkirk. The traditional county bordered Midlothian to the south-east, Lanarkshire to the south-west and Stirlingshire to the west. Its border with Midlothian was formed by the Briech Water, from its source until it reached the Almond, and it then followed the Almond to the Firth of Forth (except by Livingston, where Midlothian intruded about a mile past the Almond to include the hamlets of Howden, Craigshill, and Pumpherston). The western border was formed first by the Drumtassie Burn and then by the Avon. It had an area of 120 sq. miles (310 km2), making it the third smallest of Scotland's 33 counties and smaller than the modern council area.

The geology of West Lothian is typical for the Midland valley area geological of Scotland. Most of the bedrock surface area is underlaid by Carboniferous sedimentary rocks running in strips from north to south, with a variety of glacial deposits. The exception is the Bathgate Hills, which are composed of volcanic rocks to the north of Bathgate and around Linlithgow. Other rock types include oil shale, sandstone, dolerite. The eastern and southern rocks are the oldest, specifically Devonian sandstones and volcanic rocks in the Pentland Hills. In the middle of the county there is a large field of shale oil running south to north (underneath the settlements of Broxburn, Livingston and West Calder), then sedimentary and basalt rocks, which supply silica sand. In the far west of the county, a large carboniferous coalfield exists; it extends underneath Whitburn, Blackridge and Harthill. The oil shale in West Lothian is an organic-rich, fine-grained sedimentary rock containing kerogen (a solid mixture of organic chemical compounds) from which liquid hydrocarbons can be extracted. This extraction was carried out extensively in the region in the late 19th and early 20th centuries, by a process developed by the chemist James Young.

The area rises from lowlands in the north to the Pentland Hills in the southeast, while the southwest is moorland. West Cairn Hill is the highest peak and Current County Top (CoU) at 562 m (1,844 ft). The previous County Top was Cairnpapple Hill which is now the Historical County Top (CoH). Two thirds of the land is agricultural, while a tenth is urban. Significant watercourses include the Almond and the Union Canal, while the main bodies of water are Linlithgow Loch, Dundas Loch, Humbie Reservoir, Lochcote Reservoir, Beecraigs Loch and Bangour Reservoir. The small island of Inchgarvie near the Forth Bridge lies within the historic borders of the county.

History

Westlothiana ("animal from West Lothian") is a genus of reptile-like tetrapod that lived about 338 million years ago during the latest part of the Visean age of the Carboniferous. Members of the genus bore a superficial resemblance to modern-day lizards. The type specimen was discovered in the East Kirkton Limestone at the East Kirkton Quarry in 1984.

West Lothian was extensively settled in prehistoric times, and several ancient burial sites have been uncovered, such as at Cairnpapple Hill, described as one of Scotlands richest archaeological sites and one of the earlier places of organised worship in the country. There are remains of hillforts on Cockleroy, Peace Knowe, Bowden, Cairnpapple, and Binns Hills. The area was anciently inhabited by Britons of the tribe known as the Votadini or Gododdin. By 83 AD, southern Scotland had been conquered by Romans, who built a road from their fort at Cramond to the eastern end of the Antonine Wall, as well as forts in West Lothian (of which Castle Greg is a known example). The Romans withdrew roughly two centuries later, and the area was left to the Britons until the arrival of Anglo-Saxons in the fifth and sixth centuries, who brought Lothian under the rule of the Kingdom of Northumbria. In later centuries the region was regularly overrun by Gaelic-speaking Scots, and it became permanently part of the Kingdom of Scotland in the 11th century.

Scotland was split into sheriffdoms, what would later become counties, in the reign of David I. The first known reference to a sheriff of Linlithgow occurs in a charter dating from the reign of his successor Malcolm IV. For a time West Lothian became a constabulary, but it seems to have been made a sheriffdom again during the reign of James III. During the medieval period, settlements such as Linlithgow, Abercorn, Dalmeny and Torphichen grew in importance. Torphichen church is said to have been founded by St. Ninian in about 400AD, a small wooden structure on the site of the present church (itself rebuilt in 1756) and in 1165, the Knights Hospitaller of St. John  made their Scottish headquarters at Torphichen and the Preceptory stands as testament to their presence.

In pre-industrial times West Lothian was almost entirely agricultural. In the way of heavy industry there was a silver mine at Hilderston near Cairnpapple, a cotton mill at Blackburn, paper mills at Linlithgow, and shallow coal mines around Bathgate and Whitburn. The county was radically changed by the Industrial Revolution, (from about 1760 to sometime between 1820 and 1840) with the opening of deep-pit iron, coal, and shale oil mines, as well as foundries and brickworks, which dramatically altered the landscape. In Bathgate, the Scottish Chemist James Young's discovery of cannel coal in the Boghead area of Bathgate, and his subsequent opening of the Bathgate Chemical Works in 1852 transformed the town and the adjacent landscape. The works were the world's first commercial oil-works, manufacturing paraffin oil and paraffin wax, signalling an end to the rural community of previous centuries. When the cannel coal resources dwindled around 1866, Young and his chemical works started distilling paraffin from much more readily available shale. Shale oil extraction reached its height in the county during the Victorian era. By 1871, there were over 50 oil works producing more than 25 million gallons each year. The five largest oil shale companies (Young's Paraffin Light & Mineral Oil Company, Broxburn Oil Company, Pumpherston Shale Oil Company, Oakbank Oil Company and James Ross & Company Philpstoun Oil Works) were concentrated in West Lothian and would later merge to become Scottish Oils Ltd. The increased industrialisation led to a growing population and the development of numerous villages, such as Pumpherston and Broxburn. The bings (black and pink hills of shale waste) produced by the mining industry, 19 of which still stand in West Lothian, were at first considered blights, but now are thought of as monuments to Scotland's industrial past, and a representation of one appears on the council's coat of arms. The bings are also seen as important for local and national biodiversity.

The Local Government (Scotland) Act 1889 established a uniform system of county councils in Scotland and realigned the boundaries of many of Scotland's counties. Subsequently, West Lothian County Council was created in 1890. The historic county of West Lothian or of Linlithgowshire contained six burghs: Armadale, Bathgate, Bo'ness, Linlithgow, Queensferry, and Whitburn. Areas outside the burghs were administered as districts, of which there were also six: Borrowstounness, Linlithgow, Queensferry, Torphichen & Bathgate, Uphall, and Whitburn & Livingston. The county was also split into twelve parishes; these were not used for administrative purposes after 1930. West Lothian County Council was based at the County Buildings in the High Street, Linlithgow.

Prior to 1925, the county was formally called the "county of Linlithgow" or Linlithgowshire, although the name West Lothian had long been used as an informal alternative name. Following a petition by the county council the government changed the name formally to "Westlothian" under the Westlothian (Bathgate District) Water Order Confirmation Act 1925, which received royal assent on 27 March 1925. In May 1927 the county council resolved that West Lothian should be written as two words rather than one. The Local Government (Scotland) Act 1947 subsequently gave statutory confirmation for the two word version of the name.

In the Second World War the county adopted during Warship Week the destroyer HMS Wallace raising over £547,000 in donations. Many of the houses built for the expanding population during the 19th and 20th century were of poor quality, necessitating the building of thousands of council houses in the latter part of the 20th century, especially at Livingston, where several smaller settlements were historically mining villages. Under the New Towns Act of 1946, Livingston was designated as a New Town on 16 April 1962.

Heavy industry in the county declined after the Second World War, and the last shale oil mine closed in 1962. In 1975, as a result of the Local Government (Scotland) Act 1973, the boundaries of West Lothian were adjusted, so that some western areas of Midlothian were added to the country, while some West Lothian settlements became part of Falkirkshire and Edinburgh. The 1973 Act abolished the counties, burghs, and districts, instead creating a system of regions and districts. West Lothian was made a district of Lothian region but lost the burgh of Bo'ness and the district of Bo'ness to Falkirk district of Central Region, the burgh of Queensferry and the district of Kirkliston and part of Winchburgh to Edinburgh district of Lothian Region. It gained East Calder and West Calder districts from Midlothian. The two-tier system was abolished by the Local Government etc. (Scotland) Act 1994, and the district of West Lothian was made into a unitary council area named West Lothian Council.

Government and politics

Council
West Lothian Council is the local authority for the West Lothian area of Scotland and has 33 elected members. Councillors are generally elected every five years, with the next election falling in summer 2022. The current council composition is:

Parliamentary representation
West Lothian is represented in the Scottish Parliament by two constituency members and seven regional members of the Scottish Parliament (MSPs).

In the Parliament of the United Kingdom West Lothian is represented by two members of Parliament. Hannah Bardell represents the Livingston constituency, Martyn Day represents the Linlithgow and East Falkirk (UK Parliament constituency).

The West Lothian question, referring to whether Scottish, Welsh, and Northern Irish MPs should be allowed to vote on English laws, is so named because it was supposedly first raised by Tam Dalyell while he was MP for West Lothian.

Settlements
The creation of the modern council area drastically altered West Lothian's boundaries. Significant towns not included in the modern county are the coastal burghs of Bo'ness and Queensferry and the town of Kirkliston. Large parts of the southern urban area of Livingston, which were historically within Midlothian, were however transferred to West Lothian.

In both historic and modern West Lothian

Abercorn
Armadale
Auldcathie
Bathgate
Blackburn
Blackridge
Bridgend
Broxburn
Deans
Dechmont
East Whitburn
Ecclesmachan
Eliburn
Fauldhouse
Greenrigg
Knightsridge
Ladywell
Linlithgow
Livingston (part)
Livingston Village
Longridge
Philpstoun
Seafield
Stoneyburn
Torphichen
Uphall
Uphall Station
Westrigg
Winchburgh
Whitburn

Historically in West Lothian, since transferred elsewhere

Blackness (now in Falkirk)
Bo'ness (now in Falkirk)
Dalmeny (now in Edinburgh)
Kirkliston (now in Edinburgh)
Muirhouses (now in Falkirk)
South Queensferry (now in Edinburgh)

In modern West Lothian, not historically part of the county
All of the following areas were historically in Midlothian:

Adambrae 
Addiewell
Bellsquarry
Breich
Cobbinshaw
Craigshill 
Dedridge 
East Calder 
Harburn 
Howden
Kirknewton
Levenseat
Livingston (part)
Mid Calder 
Murieston 
Polbeth 
Pumpherston 
West Calder
Wilkieston

Culture, Landmarks and Community

Landmarks

Cairnpapple Hill is a scheduled ancient monument and hill with a dominating position in central lowland Scotland with extensive views.

Torphichen Preceptory is a 12th-century church in the village of Torphichen. It comprises the remains of the preceptory (headquarters) of the Knights Hospitaller of the Order of St John of Jerusalem in Scotland.

Historic houses in West Lothian include Linlithgow Palace, a ruined palace that was one of the principal residences of the monarchs of Scotland in the 15th and 16th centuries and is the birthplace of Mary, Queen of Scots. It is now a visitor attraction in the care of Historic Environment Scotland.

The House of the Binns is an early 17th century historic house and estate near Philpstoun. The house is the historic home of the Binn family whose owners included Sir Thomas Dalyell a Scottish Royalist general in the Wars of the Three Kingdoms, and Sir Tam Dalyell, a member of the House of Commons from 1962 to 2005.

Hopetoun House is a large country house and estate near South Queensferry that was built between 1699 and 1701, and was designed by Sir William Bruce. The house was then hugely extended from 1721 by William Adam until his death in 1748, being one of his most notable projects. The interior was completed by his sons John Adam and Robert Adam. Midhope Castle is a 16th-century tower house on the Hopetoun estate that was used as a location in the Outlander TV series on Starz as the main character, Jamie Fraser's family home called Lallybroch (Broch Tuarach).

Community facilities

There are several public country parks in West Lothian, including Beecraigs Country Park (a 370 hectare park between Bathgate and Linlithgow with forests, a visitor centre and a loch), Polkemmet Country Park (a 68 hectare park near Whitburn with woodlands, river walks and outdoor facilities), and Almondell and Calderwood Country Park along the Almond river valley near Mid Calder.

Blawhorn Moss is a raised bog located near Blackridge that has been a national nature reserve since 1980 and is the largest and least disturbed raised bog in the Lothians.

Health
Public healthcare in West Lothian is administered by NHS Lothian within NHS Scotland.

The main hospital for West Lothian is St John's Hospital in Livingston. The hospital has a dedicated Accident and Emergency department with 550 beds and opened in 1989. St Johns is a teaching hospital for the University of Edinburgh Medical School. Other public hospitals include Tippethill House Hospital a community hospital in Armadale and St Michael's Hospital, a community hospital in Linlithgow.

West Lothian previously had a psychiatric hospital with general hospital in the Dechmont area called Bangour Village Hospital. The hospital opened in 1904 and eventually had beds for 55 officers and 2571 other ranks. The hospital started closing in the 1990s and closed completely in 2004 after the remaining services were transferred to St John's Hospital.

The Linburn Centre is a health centre for blinded war veterans at Wilkieston. The centre is located within the estate of Linburn House, a country house which was demolished in 1955.

Museums
The Museum of the Scottish Shale Oil Industry was created in 1990, to preserve the history of the shale industry in West Lothian and beyond.  It is sited on a former mill at Millfield, near Livingston and is attached to the Almond Valley Heritage Centre, a large farm and play area.

In Bathgate, the Bennie Museum is a museum of local history and heritage that is run by volunteers under the management of a charitable trust. It opened in 1989 and is housed used in two former derelict cottages donated by the Bennie family to the local community in 1980.

The Linlithgow Museum is a volunteer-run local history museum in Linlithgow. The museum is housed in the Linlithgow Partnership Centre, along with the West Lothian Family History Society and library.

Military Museum Scotland is a military history museum in Wilkieston that covers Scottish military history from the First World War to the present day.

The Museum of Scottish Railways is a railway museum located within the station yard of Bo'ness at the Bo'ness and Kinneil Railway.

Economy

West Lothian has a diverse economy and as of 2020 had approximately 4,500 businesses providing almost 72,000 jobs in the area. In 2014, West Lothian Council reported that the five largest employment sectors in the council area were healthcare, construction, retail, manufacturing, and business administration and support
services. While historically, mining and shale oil production were key employers in the region, as of 2014 they only accounted for 0.7% of persons employed in West Lothian. The ten largest private employers in West Lothian are Sky UK, Tesco, Mitsubishi Electric, IQVIA (formerly Quintiles/Q2 Solutions), Asda, Morrisons, Johnson & Johnson, Schuh, Jabil and Shin-Etsu Europe. The two largest public sector employers in the county are West Lothian Council and NHS Scotland.

The Starlaw distillery is a Scotch whisky grain distillery at Bathgate that is owned by French drinks group La Martiniquaise. The distillery opened in 2010 and can produce 25 million litres annually and has 29 ageing warehouses (cellars) across 75 hectares at the distillery to allow for the maturation of over 600,000 barrels. Glenmorangie, the whisky distillers have offices and a bottling facility in Livingston that was opened in 2011.

West Lothian has several shopping centres, the largest of which are located in Livingston, including 'The Centre' (comprising more than 1,000,000 square foot of retail space) and Livingston Designer Outlet (the largest outlet mall in Scotland). The combined retail spaces of central Livingston form the largest indoor shopping location in Scotland and the 10th largest in the UK.

There are several large scale wind farms in West Lothian, predominantly in the south-west of the county, used to produce electricity across the region, including Pates Hill wind farm, Harburnhead wind farm, and Black Law wind farm.

Transport

Road
The main trunk roads in West Lothian are:
 The M9 Motorway from the border with Edinburgh, bypassing north of the town of Linlithgow towards Falkirk.
 The A89 road from Glasgow that passes through Caldercruix, Blackridge, Armadale, Bathgate, Dechmont, Uphall, Broxburn before terminating at a roundabout in Newbridge near Edinburgh.
 The M8 motorway that connects Glasgow and Edinburgh passes across West Lothian connecting communities including Livingston and Bathgate.

Other principal A roads in West Lothian include the A71 road (which passes through the south of the county connecting settlements including Livingston, Polbeth, West Calder and Breich), the A899 and A705 in Livingston, and the A801 road which runs from east of Polmont to Whitburn.

Rail

Several railway routes run through West Lothian. These include:
 The North Clyde Line between Glasgow and Edinburgh via stations such as Livingston North, Bathgate, Armadale and Blackridge.
 The Shotts Line between Glasgow and Edinburgh via stations such as Faulhouse, Breich, Addiewell, West Calder, Livingston South and Kirknewtown.
 The Glasgow–Edinburgh via Falkirk line via Linlithgow railway station.

West Lothian has a number of former, disused and defunct railway lines, principally branch lines that originated in connection with oil, mineral and shale mining activities in the 19th century but were later closed as traffic diminished and industrial operations ceased.

Many of the railways in West Lothian use significant viaducts to cross rivers, ravines and other difficult terrain. One prominent example is the Almond Valley Viaduct built by railway engineer John Miller to carry the Glasgow–Edinburgh via Falkirk line and completed in 1842. The viaduct is 1.5 miles long with 36 masonry arches, is Category A listed and features as the logo of West Lothian Council.

Air
West Lothian has no airport or airfields in current operation. The county has a few historic airfields, now defunct, including a temporary airfield that once existed in Bathgate. While the village of Kirknewtown is inside West Lothian, the nearby RAF Kirknewton airfield lies inside the boundary of Edinburgh. The nearest airport in operation to West Lothian is Edinburgh Airport.

Education
West Lothian has 11 secondary schools, 12 special schools, 67 primary schools, and 60 nurseries. While West Lothian has no university, further and adult education facilities are provided at West Lothian College based in Livingston. The college has sports facilities, a library, a training restaurant for hospitality students, and a salon/spa. The college provides educational services to over 8,000 students a year and has 350 staff.

Scotland's Rural College (SRUC) has a campus in Livingston at Oatridge, near Ecclesmachan providing courses on subjects such as agriculture, veterinary medicine, conservation, horticulture, and landscaping.

West Lothian has 14 public libraries. A local and regional history library which includes items on the history of West Lothian and Linlithgowshire is located in Linlithgow.

Sports

West Lothian has dozens of professional and local level football teams playing across a variety of leagues (tiers) in the Scottish football league system. In the  Scottish Premiership, Livingston F.C. who relocated to Livingston in 1995 to the Almondvale Stadium, represent the county. In the Lowland Football League other West Lothian Clubs play, including Blackburn United F.C., Broxburn Athletic F.C., and Linlithgow Rose F.C. West Lothian has numerous junior football clubs, some of whom, such as Bathgate Thistle F.C. (whose ground is at Creamery Park) play in the Scottish Junior Football Association.

The West Lothian Sports Council represents a variety of sports clubs and organisations in West Lothian. Other sports teams in West Lothian include Linlithgow RFC, a Scottish Rugby Union club who play in East Regional League Division One, Livingston RFC, and the Edinburgh Monarchs, a Scottish Speedway team, based in Armadale who compete in the SGB Championship. Cricket is played at a local level at sites such as Boghall Cricket Club Ground in Linlithgow.

Swimming facilities are located across West Lothian in most of the towns and Swim West Lothian is an organisation, operating in partnership with West Lothian Council and Scottish Swimming that organises local swimming clubs, training and swimming galas.

Notable residents
Notable residents of West Lothian include  monarchs and political figures including Mary Queen of Scots (born at Linlithgow Palace), King James the Fifth (born at Linlithgow Palace), Robin Cook (the Member of Parliament for Livingston from 1983 to 2005), Alex Salmond (from Linlithgow, the former First Minister of Scotland), and Sir Tom Dalyell (the Member of Parliament for Linlithgow from 1962 to 2005).

West Lothian sports personalities include Dario Franchitti (from Whitburn, four-time Indy Car series champion, and three-time winner of the Indianapolis 500), Paul di Resta (from Uphall, DTM race driver for Mercedes-Benz, and the cousin of Dario Franchitti), and Peter 'Snakebite' Wright (born in Livingston, PDC World darts champion).

Actors, musicians and entertainers include Susan Boyle (from Blackburn, a singer who achieved fame on the TV series Britain's Got Talent), Lewis Capaldi (a singer/songwriter from Whitburn and Bathgate), Ian Colquhoun (from Livingston, author and actor), Leon Jackson (from Whitburn, winner of The X Factor in 2007) and David Tennant (from Bathgate, actor)

Figures from industry and academia include John Fleming (from Bathgate, a naturalist, zoologist and geologist), Sir Charles Wyville Thomson (from Linlithgow, a natural historian and marine zoologist), and James Young Simpson (an obstetrician and significant figure in the history of medicine).

See also
 List of places in West Lothian

References

External links 
 
 West Lothian Council official government website
 
 West Lothian Archaeology Group
 West Lothian Family History Society

 
Counties of Scotland
Council areas of Scotland
Counties of the United Kingdom (1801–1922)